Scourfieldiales is an order of green algae in the class Pedinophyceae.

References

External links

Chlorophyta orders
Pedinophyceae
Monotypic orders